Addena Sumter-Freitag is a Canadian writer and performer. She grew up in Winnipeg, Manitoba.

Sumter-Freitag has performed her one-woman play Stay Black & Die across Canada and in Australia since 1995. It won Best Production at the Montreal Fringe Festival, and was published by Commodore Books in 2007. In 2009, Wattle and Daub Books published her collection of poems, Back in the Days. Canadian Literature called the latter a "memorably intimate journey, relating her experiences growing up as a black girl in Winnipeg's North End in the 1950s" and noted that "Sumter-Freitag's will undoubtedly become one of the most prominent poetic voices of Canada's Black community."

Sumter-Freitag is a seventh generation African Canadian.

Bibliography

Drama
Stay Black & Die (2007)

Poetry
Back in the Days (2009)

References

External links
"When 'your ears are tingling from the inside out': Addena Sumter-Freitag on Storytelling and Recording Life, from Stage to Page", interview by Christine Lyons
"Writing a Home for Prairie Blackness: Addena Sumter Freitag’s Stay Black and Die and Cheryl Foggo’s Pourin’ Down Rain", article by Karina Vernon

Living people
Canadian stage actresses
Canadian women dramatists and playwrights
Year of birth missing (living people)
Canadian women poets
21st-century Canadian actresses
21st-century Canadian poets
21st-century Canadian dramatists and playwrights
21st-century Canadian women writers